The 6th LG Cup featured:

10 players from  South Korea - Cho Hunhyun, Choi Myung-Hoon, Mok Jin-seok, Lee Chang-ho, Lee Sedol, Park Jungsang, Rui Naiwei, Seo Bongsoo, Yang Jae-ho, Yoo Changhyuk
6 players from  Japan - Cho Chikun, Kobayashi Koichi, O Meien, O Rissei, Ryu Shikun, Yamashita Keigo
5 players from  China - Chang Hao, Luo Xihe, Ma Xiaochun, Yu Bin, Zhou Heyang
1 player from  Taiwan - Zhou Junxun
1 player from  North America - Michael Redmond
1 player from  Europe - Alexandre Dinerchtein

Tournament

Final

LG Cup (Go)
2002 in go